Ronald Greenwood CBE (11 November 1921 – 9 February 2006) was an English football player and manager, best known for being manager of the England national football team from 1977 until 1982, as well as being manager of West Ham United for 13 years, a time during which the club gained much of its fame. His final role in football was managing the England national football team.

Early years
Ron Greenwood was born at 15 Lennox Street, Worsthorne, near Burnley, Lancashire, but moved to London in 1931 during the Depression. He was educated at the Wembley County Grammar School which now forms part of Alperton Community School in Middlesex, leaving at the age of 14 to be an apprentice sign-writer. He served with an RAF mobile radio unit first of all in Northern Ireland and later in France during the Second World War.

Playing career
Greenwood played as a centre-half, joining Chelsea as an amateur whilst training as an apprentice sign-writer. During World War II he served in the Royal Air Force in Northern Ireland and guested for Belfast Celtic. In 1945, he left Chelsea for Bradford Park Avenue and made 59 league appearances over the next four seasons.

In 1949, Greenwood moved to the club he supported as a boy, Brentford, his £9,500 fee breaking the club's incoming transfer record. He made 147 appearances and scored one goal. After three years at Brentford, he returned to Chelsea, where he played 66 times and won a First Division winners' medal in 1954–55 under Ted Drake. That summer, he moved to Fulham, where he made another 42 league appearances before retiring at the end of the 1955–56 season. He was never capped for his country, though he did make a single 'B' team appearance, whilst at Brentford, in a 1–0 victory against the Netherlands, on 23 March 1952, at the Olympishe Stadion, Amsterdam. At the end of his playing career in 1956, Greenwood became an active freemason attending the Lodge of Proven Fellowship No. 6225, but resigned in 1977.

Coaching career
After retiring Greenwood moved into coaching. He coached Eastbourne United, Oxford University (where he came to the attention of Sir Harold Thompson, a future Chairman of The Football Association), and England youth teams. He combined the England under-23 post with being the assistant manager at Arsenal under George Swindin, having moved to Highbury in December 1957. He remained there until April 1961, when he was selected by chairman Reg Pratt to replace Ted Fenton as manager of West Ham United.

Greenwood's reign at West Ham brought them sizeable success. He oversaw the development of players such as the 1966 FIFA World Cup-winning trio of Bobby Moore, Geoff Hurst and Martin Peters, and under him the Hammers won the FA Cup in 1964 and the European Cup Winners' Cup in 1965 – the first two major trophies of their history. West Ham's league form under Greenwood was less impressive, usually finishing in the lower half of the First Division table, though they did come 6th in 1972–73. In his final season, West Ham finished 18th, just one point from relegation.

He moved upstairs in 1974, becoming the club's general manager for the next three years, with John Lyall being placed in charge of the first team. In the first season of this arrangement, West Ham won another FA Cup.

After England coach Don Revie's resignation, Greenwood was appointed full-time manager, ending his 16-year association with West Ham United. Under Greenwood, England qualified for UEFA Euro 1980, where they were knocked out in the group stages. England also qualified for the 1982 FIFA World Cup under Greenwood, their first World Cup in twelve years. England came through the tournament unbeaten, but were knocked out in the second group stage after 0–0 draws against West Germany and Spain.

Greenwood retired from football after the 1982 World Cup, with the national coach's job going to Bobby Robson. One major landmark during Greenwood's tenure was the selection of the first black player for England, Viv Anderson, in 1978. Greenwood stated "Yellow, purple or black – if they're good enough, I'll pick them".

Life after football

After his career in football Greenwood was a regular analyst on BBC Radio. He died of a heart attack on the morning on 9 February 2006, aged 84, after a long struggle with Alzheimer's disease. When West Ham played Birmingham City in a Premier League fixture on 13 February 2006, a one-minute silence was held in Greenwood's memory. West Ham won the game 3–0.

The Town Council of Loughton, where Greenwood lived during his time as West Ham manager, erected a blue plaque to his memory on one of his former houses in the town, 22 Brooklyn Avenue: this was unveiled by Sir Trevor Brooking and the Town Mayor, Chris Pond on 28 October 2008. The Heritage Foundation charity erected a blue plaque in Greenwood's memory at West Ham's Upton Park, which was unveiled by his family on 21 January 2007.

Greenwood was inducted into the English Football Hall of Fame in 2006, recognising his achievements as a manager in the English game. He is also a member of the FA and LMA Halls of Fame. He was survived by his widow, Lucy. He is buried in the Town Cemetery at Sudbury in Suffolk.

Honours

Player

Chelsea
First Division
Winners: 1954-55

Manager

West Ham United
European Cup Winners' Cup
Winners: 1965
FA Cup
Winners: 1964
FA Charity Shield
Winners: 1964 (shared)

References

External links

Obituary from BBC Sport
Obituary from The Times
Obituary from The Guardian

1921 births
2006 deaths
1982 FIFA World Cup managers
Arsenal F.C. non-playing staff
Belfast Celtic F.C. players
Bradford (Park Avenue) A.F.C. players
Brentford F.C. players
Chelsea F.C. players
Commanders of the Order of the British Empire
England national football team managers
English footballers
English Football Hall of Fame inductees
English football managers
English Football League managers
Association football defenders
Fulham F.C. players
People from Loughton
People from Worsthorne
English Football League players
UEFA Euro 1980 managers
West Ham United F.C. managers
England B international footballers
Freemasons of the United Grand Lodge of England
Association football coaches
Royal Air Force personnel of World War II